Çankırı Province is a province of Turkey, which lies close to the capital, Ankara. The provincial capital is Çankırı.

Economy
Çankırı is primarily agricultural with wheat, beans, corn and tomatoes the most common crops.

Climate
Summers in Çankırı are hot with little rain. Winters are cold with rain and occasional snow.

Districts

Çankırı province is divided into 12 districts (capital district in bold):
 Atkaracalar
 Bayramören
 Çankırı
 Çerkeş
 Eldivan
 Ilgaz
 Kızılırmak
 Korgun
 Kurşunlu
 Orta
 Şabanözü
 Yapraklı

See also
İnandıktepe

References

External links

  Çankırı governor's official website
  Çankırı local news website